Apostrophe (Greek ἀποστροφή, apostrophé, "turning away"; the final e being sounded) is an exclamatory figure of speech. It occurs when a speaker breaks off from addressing the audience (e.g., in a play) and directs speech to a third party such as an opposing litigant or some other individual, sometimes absent from the scene. Often the addressee is a personified abstract quality or inanimate object. In dramatic works and poetry written in or translated into English, such a figure of speech is often introduced by the vocative exclamation, "O". Poets may apostrophize a beloved, the Muses, God or gods, love, time, or any other entity that can't respond in reality.

Examples
 "O death, where is thy sting? O grave, where is thy victory?" 1 Corinthians 15:55, Paul the Apostle
 "O, pardon me, thou bleeding piece of earth, / That I am meek and gentle with these butchers! / Thou art the ruins of the noblest man / That ever lived in the tide of times." William Shakespeare, Julius Caesar, act 3, scene 1
 "O happy dagger! This is thy sheath; there rest, and let me die." Romeo and Juliet, act 5, scene 3, 169–170.
 "To what green altar, O mysterious priest, / Lead'st thou that heifer lowing at the skies, / And all her silken flanks with garlands drest?" John Keats, "Ode on a Grecian Urn"
 "O eloquent, just, and mighty Death!" Sir Walter Raleigh, A Historie of the World
 "Thou hast the keys of Paradise, oh just, subtle, and mighty opium!" Thomas De Quincey, Confessions of an English Opium-Eater
 "Roll on, thou dark and deep blue Ocean – roll!" Lord Byron, Childe Harold's Pilgrimage
"Thou glorious sun!" Samuel Taylor Coleridge, "This Lime Tree Bower"
 "Death, be not proud, though some have called thee / Mighty and dreadful, for thou art not so." John Donne, "Holy Sonnet X"
 "And you, Eumaeus..." Homer, the Odyssey 14.55, κτλ.
 "O My friends, there is no friend." Montaigne, originally attributed to Aristotle
 "Ah Bartleby! Ah Humanity!" Herman Melville, "Bartleby, the Scrivener"
 "O black night, nurse of the golden eyes!" Electra in Euripides' Electra (c. 410 BC, line 54), in the translation by David Kovacs (1998).
 "Then come, sweet death, and rid me of this grief." Queen Isabel in Edward II by Christopher Marlowe

See also
 
 List of narrative techniques
 Fourth wall
 Simile

References

Rhetorical techniques
Acting techniques